Beatrice M. Doran is an Irish historian, author, and former chief librarian at the Royal College of Surgeons in Ireland (RCSI).

Background
Doran was born in Donnybrook, Dublin, where she is still a resident. She attended Muckross Park College and University College Dublin (UCD), where she received a Bachelor of Arts and a Michael Smurfit Graduate Business School Master of Business Administration. She also holds a diploma in librarianship. She obtained a PhD from UCD in 2011 with her thesis Knowledge Management: An Empirical Analysis in Relation to Irish Healthcare, which included research carried out at Beaumont Hospital, Dublin.

Career
Doran has worked in several libraries, including at Ulster University, University College Cork, and the Royal Dublin Society. She was appointed librarian at RCSI in 1986 where she worked until her retirement in 2007. She is a former president of the Library Association of Ireland.

Doran is a former vice president and council member of Cork Historical and Archaeological Society. She is a member of the Ballsbridge, Donnybrook and Sandymount Historical Society, the Irish Georgian Society, the Royal Society of Antiquaries of Ireland and the Royal Dublin Society. She has written several books on the history of Donnybrook.

Bibliography
From the Grand Canal to the Dodder: Illustrious Live (2021)
Donnybrook Then and Now (2014)
Donnybrook: A History (2013)
Knowledge Management: An Empirical Analysis in Relation to Irish Healthcare (2011)

References

Living people
Irish librarians
Alumni of University College Dublin
Women librarians
Royal College of Surgeons in Ireland
20th-century Irish historians
21st-century Irish historians
Writers from Dublin (city)
20th-century Irish women writers
21st-century Irish women writers
Irish women academics
Year of birth missing (living people)